Melgund is an unincorporated place and railway point in geographic Pic Township in the Unorganized Part of Thunder Bay District in northwestern Ontario, Canada. It is on the Canadian Pacific Railway transcontinental main line, during the construction of which the place was established, between Heron Bay (Ojibways of the Pic River First Nation) to the west and Pringle to the east. It has a passing track. Meglund also lies, in an even narrower bracket, between the Black River to the west and the tributary Melgund Creek to the east.

References

Other map sources:

Communities in Thunder Bay District